Singapore competed at the 1968 Summer Olympics in Mexico City, Mexico, for the first time as a fully independent country. Four competitors, all men, took part in six events in three sports.

Athletics

Men's 100 metres
Canagasabai Kunalan
First round : 10.4 s 
Second round : 10.3 s (did not advance)
 
Men's 200 metres
Canagasabai Kunalan — Heats: 21.3 s (did not advance)

Shooting

One male shooter represented Singapore in 1968.

25 m pistol
Loh Kok Heng — 566 points (→ 46th place)

50 m pistol
Loh Kok Heng — 499 points (→ 66th place)

Swimming

Patricia Chan — did not start any of the six events she was entered

Weightlifting

Bantamweight
Chye Hong-Tung
Press: 92.5 kg
Snatch: 87.5 kg
Jerk: 122.5 kg
Total: 302.5 kg (→ 12th place)

Featherweight
Chua Phung Kim — disqualified

References

External links
Official Olympic Reports

Nations at the 1968 Summer Olympics
1968
Oly